The chapters of Brave Story manga are written and illustrated by Yoichiro Ono. It was inspired by the novel's winning of the Batchelder Award. The manga serialization in Shinchosha's Weekly Comic Bunch ended on March 14, 2008. The individual chapters were published into 20 tankōbon volumes, which were released between April 9, 2004 and May 9, 2008. The manga is licensed and published in English by Tokyopop. It is also licensed in France by Kurokawa.



Volume list

References

External links

Brave Story